Kriek lambic is a style of Belgian beer, made by fermenting lambic with sour Morello cherries. Traditionally "Schaarbeekse krieken" (a rare Belgian Morello variety) from the area around Brussels are used. As the Schaarbeek type cherries have become more difficult to find, some brewers have replaced these (partly or completely) with other varieties of sour cherries, sometimes imported.

Etymology
The name is derived from the Dutch word for this type of cherry (kriek).

Brewing
Traditionally, kriek is made by breweries in and around Brussels using lambic beer to which sour cherries (with the pits) are added. A lambic is a sour and dry Belgian beer, fermented spontaneously with airborne yeast said to be native to Brussels; the presence of cherries (or raspberries) predates the almost universal use of hops as a flavoring in beer.
A traditional kriek made from a lambic base beer is sour and dry as well. The cherries are left in for a period of several months, causing a refermentation of the additional sugar. Typically no sugar will be left so there will be a fruit flavour without sweetness. There will be a further maturation process after the cherries are removed.

More recently, some lambic brewers have added sugar to the final product of their fruit beers, in order to make them less intense and more approachable to a wider audience. They also use cherry juice rather than whole cherries and are matured for much shorter periods.

Framboise is a related, less traditional Belgian beer, fermented with raspberries instead of sour cherries. Kriek is also related to gueuze, which is not a fruit beer but is also based on refermented lambic beer. Some breweries, like Liefmans, make "kriek" beers based on oud bruin beer instead of lambic.

Commercial examples

Traditional krieks include:

Boon Kriek
Cantillon Kriek Lambic
3 Fonteinen Kriek
Girardin Kriek 1882
Hanssens Kriek Lambic
Oud Beersel Oude Kriek Vieille
Timmermans Traditional Kriek Lambic

Sweetened krieks include:

Belle-Vue Kriek Lambic
Chapeau Kriek Lambic
Lindemans Kriek Lambic
Mort Subite Kriek Lambic
Timmermans Kriek Lambic
Van Honsebrouck St. Louis Kriek Lambic
La Sultane Halal Kriek

Kriek based on Oud Bruin include:

De Ryck Kriek Fantastiek
Liefmans Kriek
Kasteel Kriek
Verhaeghe Echt Kriekenbier

References

External links

Beer styles
Beer in Belgium
Traditional Speciality Guaranteed products from Belgium
Cherries